Lonestar is the debut studio album from the American country music band of the same name. Released in 1995 on BNA Records (see 1995 in country music), it features five singles: "Tequila Talkin'", "No News", "Runnin' Away With My Heart", "Heartbroke Every Day", and "When Cowboys Didn't Dance", of which "No News" was a Number One hit on the Billboard country charts. The album has been certified gold by the Recording Industry Association of America for shipping 500,000 copies in the United States.

Content
The album's lead-off single was "Tequila Talkin'", which reached a peak of number eight on the Billboard country charts. Following this song was the band's first number-one hit, "No News" (the B-side to "Tequila Talkin'"), which spent three weeks at the top of the country charts. "Runnin' Away With My Heart" also peaked at number eight, followed by the number 45 "When Cowboys Didn't Dance" (which was much more successful in Canada, peaking at number 18 there), and finally, the number eighteen "Heartbroke Every Day". The latter overlapped on the charts with "Maybe He'll Notice Her Now," a duet between Lonestar's then-lead singer Richie McDonald and Mindy McCready, who also recorded on BNA at the time.

Also included on the album is a cover of Roy Clark's 1982 single "Paradise Knife and Gun Club".

Critical reception
The album received mixed critical reception. Stephen Thomas Erlewine gave it four stars out of five in his Allmusic review, where he called the album's sound "an accomplished and impassioned hardcore honky tonk." Brian Wahlert of Country Standard Time magazine gave a mostly-favorable review, saying that the album was "solid [and] traditional," but also saying "Lonestar seems very similar to Shenandoah — energetic and fun, but not spectacular." Rick Mitchell of New Country magazine gave a one-and-a-half star rating, with his review criticizing the album for relying on a large number of studio musicians and background singers, and calling the sound "lite rock with a twang."

Track listing

Personnel 
As listed in liner notes.
Lonestar
 Richie McDonald – keyboards, acoustic guitar, backing vocals, lead vocals (2, 4, 5, 8, 10)
 Dean Sams – acoustic piano, keyboards, acoustic guitar, harmonica, backing vocals
 Michael Britt – electric guitar, B-Bender guitar, acoustic guitar, backing vocals
 John Rich – lead vocals (1, 3, 6, 7, 9), backing vocals, bass guitar
 Keech Rainwater – drums

Additional musicians
 Dennis Burnside – acoustic piano, keyboards, Hammond B3 organ, string arrangements 
 Mark Casstevens – acoustic guitar
 Brent Mason – electric guitar
 John Willis – electric guitar, electric sitar
 Bruce Bouton – slide guitar, pedal steel guitar
 Michael Rhodes – bass guitar
 Glenn Worf – bass guitar
 Lonnie Wilson – drums, percussion, hand claps
 Rob Hajacos – fiddle, "assorted hoe-down tools"
 Nashville String Machine – strings
 John Wesley Ryles – backing vocals
 Dennis Wilson – backing vocals 
 Curtis Young – backing vocals

Production
 Don Cook – producer 
 Wally Wilson – producer 
 Mike Bradley – recording, mixing 
 Mark Capps – recording assistant, mix assistant 
 John Kunz – recording assistant, mix assistant 
 Hank Williams – mastering at MasterMix (Nashville, Tennessee)
 Scott Johnson – production assistant 
 Susan Eaddy – art direction 
 Deb Mahalanobis – design 
 Peter Nash – photography

Chart performance

Certifications

References

1995 debut albums
BNA Records albums
Lonestar albums
Albums produced by Don Cook
Albums produced by Wally Wilson